Haseem McLean (born  in San Fernando, Trinidad and Tobago) is a Trinidad and Tobago male  track cyclist, and part of the national team. He was selected to compete in the team sprint event at the 2009 UCI Track Cycling World Championships, but the team did not start.

References

External links
 Profile at cyclingarchives.com

1987 births
Living people
Trinidad and Tobago track cyclists
Trinidad and Tobago male cyclists
Place of birth missing (living people)
Cyclists at the 2010 Commonwealth Games
People from San Fernando, Trinidad and Tobago
Commonwealth Games competitors for Trinidad and Tobago
21st-century Trinidad and Tobago people